The  was a Japanese  cargo ship owned by Nippon Yusen Kaisha, Tokyo.  The ship was entered service in 1937.

The name Nagata Maru derives from Nagata jinja,  a Shinto shrine in Nagata Ward, Kobe, Japan.

History
Nagata maru was the name of several Japanese vessels. In 1900, Fujinagata Shipyards completed its first all-metal construction merchant vessel; the No.2 Nagata Maru.

List of ships named Nagata Maru

 Nagata Maru No. 1
 Nagata Maru No. 2
 Nagata Maru No. 3
 Nagata Maru No. 4
 Nagata Maru No. 5
 Nagata Maru No. 6
 Nagata Maru No. 7
 Nagata Maru No. 8
 Nagata Maru No. 9
 Nagata Maru No. 10
 Nagata Maru No. 11
 Nagata Maru No. 12
 Nagata Maru No. 13
 Nagata Maru (1937)

Pacific War
In 1939, Nagata Maru was commandeered by the Imperial Japanese Navy for use as a troopship.

During the Japanese occupation of the Gilbert Islands, she installed within 2 days the seaplane base in Makin lagoon.

In transporting Allied prisoners, it was amongst those vessels which earned the epithet "hell ships."

On 22 April 1944, Nagata Maru was part of a Singapore-to-Saigon convoy anchored off Cape St. Jacques in French Indochina.  The ship was bombed and sunk.

Notes

References

 Ponsonby-Fane, Richard.  (1964). Visiting Famous Shrines in Japan. Kyoto: Ponsonby-Fane Memorial Society.

External links
 Ship's List:  Ships of Nippon Yusen Kaisha K.K

1937 ships
Ships of the NYK Line
Nagata Maru
World War II merchant ships of Japan
Ships sunk by aircraft
World War II shipwrecks in the Pacific Ocean
Japanese hell ships